A reja ("grille") is a decorative screen of iron.

Rejas can be found in cathedrals located in Spain and Portugal. Inside the cathedrals, rejas were often placed in front of side chapels, the choir,  or even in rood screens in front of the altar. Rejas are commonly 25 to 30 ft (7.5 to 9 meters) high. Crafters who made rejas were known as rejeros, or reja-makers.

Notes and references

Steelmaking